Francesco Molino (also known as François Molino) (4 June 1768 – 1847) was an Italian guitarist, violinist, and composer.

Biography
Molino was born in Ivrea near Turin. He often travelled to Spain to give concerts. He was orchestral conductor during 1796–97. In 1820 he settled in Paris, where he lived for the remainder of his life.

His works were largely neglected until the twentieth century, when many of them were republished. Among the best-known are his Three Sonatas, 18 Preludes and Terpsichore (a set of dances), all for solo guitar. He also wrote for other instruments in combination with the guitar, including flute and violin. In 1830 he published a guitar method.

Works
Francesco Molino composed more than 60 works.

Guitar
 Opus 1: Trois sonates faciles
 Opus 5: Six thèmes avec variations
 Opus 6: Trois sonates pour la guitare (Three Sonates) 
 Sonata No.1 in D major 
 Sonata No.2 in G major
 Sonata No.3 in C major 
 Opus 9: 12 Waltzes
 Opus 9: 12 Variations on "Ah! Vous dirai-je maman"
 Opus 11: 6 Rondos
 Opus 13: 2 Fantaisies
 Opus 13: 3 Rondos
 Opus 15: Trois sonates
 Opus 17: Grande Ouverture
 Opus 18: 4 Theme and variations 
 Opus 28: Trois Rondeaux brillants d'une exécution facile 
 Opus 31: Variations
 Opus 34: Grand polonaise and 2 rondos
 Opus 41: Brilliant variations
 Opus 51: Grand sonata
 Opus 58: Variations on a Scottish air
 18 Preludes
 Romance 
 Sonatina

Violin
 Opus 68: Sonate

Guitar Duo
 Opus 47: Grande Potpourri über Themen von Rossini

Violin (or Flute) and guitar
 Opus 2: 3 Sonatas
 Opus 3: 3 Duets
 Opus 7: Trois grande sonates
 Opus 16: 3 Duets
 Opus 22: Trois grande sonates
 Opus 29: Trois grande sonates
 Opus 37: Nocturne n° 1
 Opus 38: Nocturne n° 2
 Opus 39: Nocturne n° 3
 Opus 61: 3 Duets

Guitar and Piano
 Opus 36: Nocturne n° 1
 Opus 44: Nocturne n° 2
 Opus 57: Nocturne n° 3

Trio
 Opus 4: Trois Trios, for flute, viola, and guitar
 Opus 19: Trois Trios, for flute, viola, and guitar
 Opus 30: Grand Trio Concertant, for flute or violin, viola, and guitar
 Opus 35: Second Grand Trio Concertant, for flute or violin, viola, and guitar
 Opus 45: Grand Trio, for flute, viola, and guitar

Concerto
Violinkonzert Nr. 1
 Opus 25: Violinkonzert Nr. 2 (dedicated to Kreutzer)	 
 Opus 56: Gitarrenkonzert

Method
 Opus 24: Méthode
 Opus 33: Méthode
 Opus 46: Grande méthode complette pour la guitare (Paris, 1830) (OCLC: 54138738)

Bibliography
Otto Torp: Instruction Book for the Spanish Guitar, selected from the works of F. Carulli, F. Molino & M. Giuliani (New York, E. Riley [1829]) OCLC: 28429118
Giovanni Del Lago; Giovanni Spataro: Lettere di diversi autori che trattano di musica, Österreichische Nationalbibliothek. Musiksammlung (unpublished dissertation), OCLC: 12327433

External links
 
 Tecla editions

Sheetmusic
Rischel & Birket-Smith's Collection of guitar music 1 Det Kongelige Bibliotek, Denmark
Boije Collection The Music Library of Sweden

1768 births
1847 deaths
19th-century composers
Italian Classical-period composers
Composers for the classical guitar
Italian classical guitarists
Italian male guitarists
Italian male classical composers
People from Ivrea
Italian Romantic composers
19th-century classical composers
19th-century Italian male musicians